Helminthosporium is a genus of fungi belonging to the family Massarinaceae.

The genus has cosmopolitan distribution.

Species

Species:

Helminthosporium abietis 
Helminthosporium abutilonis 
Helminthosporium acaciae

References

Fungus genera
Pleosporales